Robert Maurice White (September 28, 1912 – August 16, 1969) was an American football coach.  He was the ninth head football coach at Kentucky State University in Frankfort, Kentucky, serving for one season, in 1946, and compiling a record of 5–4.

White went on to coach at Delaware State University and Howard University.

White was later an assistant director of player personnel for the Washington Redskins. He died of cancer on August 16, 1969, at a hospital in Washington, D.C.

Head coaching record

References

External links
 

1912 births
1969 deaths
American football centers
Delaware State Hornets football coaches
Elizabeth City State Vikings football coaches
Howard Bison football coaches
Kentucky State Thorobreds football coaches
Kentucky State Thorobreds football players
Maryland Eastern Shore Hawks football coaches
Washington Redskins executives
Junior college football coaches in the United States
People from Richmond, Kentucky
Players of American football from Kentucky
African-American coaches of American football
African-American players of American football
20th-century African-American sportspeople
Deaths from cancer in Washington, D.C.